Rachmad Hidayat (born 10 March 1991) is an Indonesian professional footballer who plays as a winger or attacking midfielder for Liga 1 club PSS Sleman.

Club career

Early career
Rachmad started his career in Putra Muda Soccer School in Medan, then, Rachmad moved to Medan United Academy. Finally he joined Pro Duta.

Pelita Bandung Raya
In 2015, he joined Pelita Bandung Raya with teammate from Pro Duta, Ghozali Siregar for 2015 Indonesia Super League season.

Sriwijaya
He signed a contract with Sriwijaya to play in 2017 Liga 1. Hidayat made his league debut on 17 April 2017 in a Sumatera's Derby match against Semen Padang, coming on as a substitute for Maldini Pali in the 46th minute.

PSMS Medan
He was signed a contract with another Sumatera club PSMS Medan to play in 2018 Liga 1. Hidayat made his league debut on 23 July 2018 in a match against PSM Makassar, he coming as a substitute for Abdul Aziz Lutfi Akbar in the injury time. On 3 August 2018, Hidayat scored his first goal for the club, scoring in a 3–1 lose over Bhayangkara in the Indonesian Liga 1.

Bhayangkara
He was signed a contract with Bhayangkara to play in 2019 Liga 1. Hidayat made his league debut on 16 May 2019 in a match against Borneo, he coming as a substitute for Dendy Sulistyawan in the 71st minute. He only made six appearances with the club.

Persija Jakarta
He signed a contract with Persija Jakarta. Hidayat made his league debut on 23 September 2019 in a match against Barito Putera, coming on as a substitute for Ramdani Lestaluhu in the 67th minute.

Return to PSMS Medan
He was signed for PSMS Medan to play in Liga 2 in the 2020 season. This season was suspended on 27 March 2020 due to the COVID-19 pandemic. The season was abandoned and was declared void on 20 January 2021.

PSIS Semarang
In 2022, Rachmad signed a contract with Indonesian Liga 1 club PSIS Semarang. He made his league debut on 6 January 2022 in a match against Persija Jakarta at the Kapten I Wayan Dipta Stadium, Gianyar.

PSS Sleman
Rachmad Hidayat became PSS Sleman's in half of the 2022–23 Liga 1. Rachmad made his debut on 14 January 2023 in a match against PSM Makassar at the Gelora B.J. Habibie Stadium, Parepare.

References

External links 
 

1991 births
Living people
Indonesian Muslims
Indonesian footballers
Pro Duta FC players
Pelita Bandung Raya players
Persib Bandung players
Sriwijaya F.C. players
PSMS Medan players
Bhayangkara F.C. players
Persija Jakarta players
PSIS Semarang players
Indonesian Premier Division players
Liga 2 (Indonesia) players
Liga 1 (Indonesia) players
People from Medan
Sportspeople from North Sumatra
Sportspeople from Medan
Association football midfielders
21st-century Indonesian people